I Can Quit Whenever I Want is a 2014 Italian crime comedy film directed by Sydney Sibilia. It was followed by two sequels, subtitled Masterclass and Ad Honorem, both released in 2017.

Plot
Pietro Zinni, a brilliant neurobiologist, loses his job at the university because of the financial crisis. Without any reasonable chance to find another contract, Pietro assembles a team of ex-researchers like him—a chemist, a cultural anthropologist, an economist, an archaeologist, and two Latin scholars—to produce a little-known smart drug that is not yet illegal under Italian law. The gang achieves immediate and unexpected success but is unprepared for the problematic lifestyle that comes with such sudden wealth.

Cast
Edoardo Leo as Pietro Zinni
Valeria Solarino as Giulia
Valerio Aprea as Mattia Argeri
Paolo Calabresi as Arturo Frantini
Libero De Rienzo as Bartolomeo Bonelli
Stefano Fresi as Alberto Petrelli
Lorenzo Lavia as Giorgio Sironi
Pietro Sermonti as Andrea De Sanctis
Sergio Solli as Professor Seta
Neri Marcorè as Murena
Francesco Acquaroli as Commissioner Galatro
Majlinda Agaj as Angelica
Guglielmo Poggi as Maurizio
Caterina Shulha as Paprika
Nadir Caselli as Ilaria
Luca Vecchi as the junkie in rehab
Matteo Corradini as the junkie in disco
Davide Gagliardi as Danilo Autero
Enzo Provenzano as the car wrecker

Accolades

References

External links
 

2014 films
2014 comedy films
2010s crime comedy films
Films about drugs
Films directed by Sydney Sibilia
Films set in Rome
Films shot in Rome
Italian crime comedy films
Latin-language films
2010s Italian-language films
2010s Italian films
Fandango (Italian company) films
Rai Cinema films